John Harvie Morris (born 23 March 1963) is an Australian actor and film producer. He is best known for playing doctor Philip Matheson in the television soap opera Home & Away and Andrew MacKenzie, the first gay character in Neighbours.

Career
Before taking up acting as a career Morris was a paratrooper in the Australian Army.

From 1988 to 1989 Morris played doctor Philip Matheson, the uncle of Steven Matheson, on soap opera Home & Away. He was one of 150 actors who auditioned for the role. The show's creator Alan Bateman hoped he would become one of the main stars of the show, "a bigger star than Kylie Minogue". The character served as the love interest for Stacey Macklin. Morris eventually tired of playing Matheson and asked the producers to kill him off, leading to the character's death in a dramatic explosion. Matheson had become popular with viewers, and Morris told Murray Clifford Evening Times that Philip was the "first long-established character to be killed off". He revealed that the studio was "swamped" with telephone calls from "distressed fans" and Morris also had thousands of fan letters. He added that his female fans could not believe that their "favourite doctor" had died. Some even protested and sent wreaths to the studio. Morris said that if he had realised the extent of Philip's popularity, he would have asked for the door to be left open for a future return.

In 1994, Morris played Andrew MacKenzie, the first gay character in Neighbours. He partly modelled the character on a friend who was gay and worked as a builder in Australia. He said that his friend was "built like a tank" and most people would assume he was straight. He felt it was a "bonus" for him to play Macca, explaining "It gave me exposure because he's a controversial character. I've never played a gay part in ten years as an actor, but let's face it, gay people are people. You don't try to be a gay person – put on a funny voice or wear a dress, you just are that person." He was disappointed that the scriptwriters did not give Macca a love interest and thought they should have gone further with his character's storyline, stating that Macca's exit after 12 weeks came as a surprise. At the time he said he had no desire to stay in soaps long-term and wanted to continue working in television and theatre productions.

Morris made a last-minute appearance as Oliver Mellors in the stage adaptation of Lady Chatterley's Lover.

In 2001 Morris played Donald J. Watt in The Singing Forest, a Julia Britton play based on Watt's memoir Stoker about the Auschwitz concentration camp. He had recently been working as a rigger due to his acting work drying up.

Personal life
Morris is the brother of federal MP Madeleine King.

Filmography

References

External links
 

1963 births
Living people
Australian male film actors
Australian male television actors
Male actors from Perth, Western Australia